The Gujarat Council of Ministers exercises executive authority of the Indian State of Gujarat. The council is chaired by the Chief Minister of Gujarat. The council serves as the highest decision-making body in the State of Gujarat and advises the Governor of Gujarat in the exercise of his or her functions. The Council of Ministers is responsible to the Gujarat Legislative Assembly.

Constitutional Provisions
Article 163 of the Constitution of India makes provision for the State Governments of the Republic of India to have a Council of Ministers, headed by a Chief Minister, so as to aid and assist that state's Governor in the exercise of his or her functions.

While the Governor is the executive Head of the State, actual executive power can only be exercised after a consensus is reached by the Council of Ministers. Upon being so advised, the Governor is expected to act accordingly.

The Governor of Gujarat appoints the Chief Minister of Gujarat. Ministers serving on the council, in turn, are appointed by the Governor under advisement by the Chief Minister. While a Council Minister technically holds office at the pleasure of the State Governor, practically, a sitting Minister may be removed by the Governor only after consulting with, and receiving advice from, the Chief Minister.

Both the Chief Minister and those serving on the Council of Ministers must also be members of the Gujarat Legislative Assembly. If he or she is not a Member of the Legislative Assembly (MLA), he or she shall obtain membership of the assembly within six months of his or her appointment. The council is collectively responsible to the Legislative Assembly and holds office till they enjoy the confidence of the Gujarat Legislative Assembly. Alternatively, a serving Council Minister may be removed by the Legislative Assembly through passage of a no confidence motion.

As per Article 164 (1A) of the Constitution of India, the maximum strength of the Council of Ministers in Gujarat will be fifteen percent of the total Legislative Assembly strength . Hence, considering that the total strength of the Legislative Assembly of Gujarat is 182 members, the State's Council of Ministers may only be served by no more than twenty seven members.

Types of Ministers

The Gujarat Council of Ministers follows the westminster's model of cabinet. There are two type of ministers.

 Cabinet Ministers.
 Ministers of State.

Cabinet Ministers

Actual power of decisions vests with cabinet ministers. The cabinet is chaired by the Chief Minister.

Ministers of State

They are also known as Deputy Ministers. They are appointed to assist cabinet ministers. However, many times, they are given independent charge of their department. In that case, they enjoy a latitude for decision making similar to a cabinet minister, with respect to those decisions under the aegis of their respective departments. However, Ministers of State do not participate in cabinet meetings.

Current council of ministers

See also
 Gujarat Legislative Assembly
 Government of Gujarat
 Politics of Gujarat

References

Latest Gujarat Mantrimandal Pdf Download 2019 in Gujarati language

External links
 Gujarat Government

Government of Gujarat
State council of ministers of India